Good to Be Alive may refer to:
Good to Be Alive (Long John Baldry album)
 Good 2b Alive, an album by Steelheart
 "Good to Be Alive" (DJ Rap song)
 "Good to Be Alive" (Slash's Snakepit song)
 "Good to Be Alive", a song by Meghan Trainor from The Peanuts Movie and Jimmy Neutron: Boy Genius
 "Good to Be Alive", a song by Tina Charles
 "Good to Be Alive", a song by Matthew Dear from Asa Breed
 "Good to Be Alive", a song by Jason Gray from A Way to See in the Dark
 "Good to Be Alive", a song by Beverley Mahood from Unmistakable 
 "Good to Be Alive", a song by Nitty Gritty Dirt Band from Speed of Life
 "Good to Be Alive", a song by The Pillbugs from Buzz for Aldrin
 "Good to Be Alive", a song from the musical farce Lucky Stiff
 "Good to Be Alive (Hallelujah)", a song by Andy Grammer
 "Good to Be Alive", a song by They Might Be Giants
 "Good To Be Alive", a song by CG5

See also 
 Great to Be Alive (disambiguation)
 It's Good to Be Alive (disambiguation)
 It's Great to Be Alive (disambiguation)